Harold M. Metts (born October 6, 1947) is an American politician and a Democratic member of the Rhode Island Senate representing District 6 since January 2005. Metts served non-consecutively in the Rhode Island General Assembly from January 1985 until December 31, 1998 in the Rhode Island House of Representatives.

Education
Metts was born in Lexington, Virginia. He earned his BS degree from Roger Williams University, his teaching certificate from Bryant College (now Bryant University), and his MEd from Rhode Island College.

Elections
1980s Metts was first elected in House District 19 in the November 6, 1984 General election and re-elected in the November 4, 1986 and November 8, 1988 general elections.
1990 Metts won the September 11, 1990 Democratic Primary and was unopposed for the November 6, 1990 General election, winning with 1,185 votes.
1992 Metts won the September 15, 1992 Democratic Primary and won the November 3, 1992 General election with 1,197 votes (85.5%) against Independent candidate Rebecca Douglas.
1994 Metts was unopposed for both the September 13, 1994 Democratic Primary and the November 8, 1994 General election, winning with 1,061 votes.
1996 Metts was unopposed for the September 10, 1996 Democratic Primary, winning with 281 votes, and won the November 5, 1996 General election with 1,156 votes (91.5%) against Republican nominee David Stahlbush.
2004 When District 6 Democratic Senator Dominick J. Ruggerio ran for re-election in District 4, Metts ran in the four-way September 14, 2004 Democratic Primary, winning with 1,341 votes (63.3%), and was unopposed for the November 2, 2004 General election with 5,019 votes.
2006 Metts was unopposed for both the September 12, 2006 Democratic Primary, winning with 1,714 votes, and the November 7, 2006 General election, winning with 4,804 votes.
2008 Metts was unopposed for the September 9, 2008 Democratic Primary, winning with 736 votes, and won the November 4, 2008 General election with 6,509 votes (90.6%) against Republican nominee Marc Coda.
2010 Metts was challenged in the September 23, 2010 Democratic Primary, winning with 1,958 votes (70.7%), and was unopposed for the November 2, 2010 General election, winning with 4,021 votes.
2012 Metts was unopposed for the September 11, 2012 Democratic Primary, winning with 1,545 votes, and won the November 6, 2012 General election, winning with 6,294 votes (91.8%) against Republican nominee Russell Hryzan.
Metts was challenged by Tiara Mack in the September 8, 2020 Democratic primary, losing with 1,011 votes (40.2%) against 1,506 votes (59.8%).

References

External links
Official page at the Rhode Island General Assembly

Harold Metts at Ballotpedia
Harold M. Metts at the National Institute on Money in State Politics

1947 births
21st-century American politicians
African-American state legislators in Rhode Island
Bryant University alumni
Living people
People from Lexington, Virginia
Politicians from Providence, Rhode Island
Rhode Island College alumni
Democratic Party Rhode Island state senators
Roger Williams University alumni
21st-century African-American politicians
20th-century African-American politicians
20th-century American politicians